Pterospathodontidae is an extinct conodont family in the order Ozarkodinida.

References

External links 

Ozarkodinida families